Dirk Demol (born 4 November 1959) is a Belgian former professional racing cyclist and a cycling team manager.

As a rider, he specialized in the spring classics, having himself won the 1988 edition of the one-day classic Paris–Roubaix, riding as a professional cyclist for Team ADR.

Racing career 
Demol grew up in Kuurne, Belgium. In 1987 he finished third at Kuurne-Brussel-Kuurne. In 1988 he won Paris-Roubaix for Belgian pro team ADR. He retired from racing in 1995.

Management career 
In 2000, Demol became assistant team manager for the U.S. Postal Service Pro Cycling Team, a position he held until 2007. He then worked as team manager for Quick Step (2008), assistant team manager for Astana (2009), and assistant team manager for Team RadioShack (2010–2011). From 2012 to 2018 he was assistant sport director for various teams including Radioshack-Nissan, RadioShack Leopard, Trek Factory Racing, and Trek-Segafredo. At the end of the 2018 season he left Trek-Segafredo and became the head sports director at Team Katusha-Alpecin for the 2019 season. He joined the Israel Cycling Academy as the assistant sports director in 2020.

Major results

1979
 1st Stage 1 Grand Prix Guillaume Tell
 3rd Ronde Van Vlaanderen Beloften
1980
 2nd Paris–Roubaix Espoirs
1982
 7th Kuurne–Brussels–Kuurne
1983
 4th Grote Prijs Jef Scherens
 9th Kampioenschap van Vlaanderen
 9th Druivenkoers Overijse
1984
 3rd Omloop van het Houtland
 7th GP Stad Zottegem
 8th Dwars door België
 10th Grand Prix de Fourmies
1985
 2nd Druivenkoers Overijse
 3rd GP Impanis
 9th De Kustpijl
 10th Kuurne–Brussels–Kuurne
1986
 2nd Omloop van het Houtland
 5th Grote Prijs Jef Scherens
 7th Scheldeprijs
 7th De Kustpijl
1987 
 2nd Kampioenschap van Vlaanderen
 3rd Kuurne–Brussels–Kuurne
 9th Road race, National Road Championships
1988
 1st Paris–Roubaix
 3rd Grand Prix de Fourmies
1989
 5th Kampioenschap van Vlaanderen
1990
 3rd Kampioenschap van Vlaanderen
 6th Kuurne–Brussels–Kuurne
1993
 4th Nokere Koerse

Grand Tour general classification results timeline

References

External links

 Demol's Profile at ThePaceline.com
  2007 Pezcyclingnews interview of Dirk Demol by Matt Wood

Belgian male cyclists
1959 births
Living people
Cyclists from West Flanders
People from Kuurne